This is a list of high schools in Saitama Prefecture.

National
, University of Tsukuba

Prefectural
 operates:

Municipal

Private
Keio Shiki Senior High School
Yamamura International High School

References

High schools in Japan
Saitama Prefecture